The Wild Pack is a fictional mercenary team appearing in American comic books published by Marvel Comics. The team is led by Silver Sable.

Publication history
The Wild Pack first appears in The Amazing Spider-Man #265 and was created by Gregory Wright, Steve Butler, and Jim Sanders.

Fictional team history
The Wild Pack is first formed by Silver Sable's father, Ernst Sablinovia, for the apprehension of international criminals, and the recovery of stolen property for a wide spectrum of clients, from major insurance companies to small nations. As a young girl, Silver Sable witnesses her mother's death at the hands of terrorists and it is then that she becomes determined to take over leadership of the group. She joins her father's team at the age of 17 and is soon promoted to second-in-command. Later, her father embarks alone to track down his wife's killer. Silver and the Wild Pack catch up with him, in time to see the villain kill her father and escape with the body. Believing her father dead, Sable assumes command of the Wild Pack.

When the number of war criminals declines, Sable turns her Wild Pack toward other activities and begins selling her services around the world. The group eventually gains the approval of the Symkarian government and in fact becomes the major source of outside income for Symkaria. While typically composed of elite mercenary soldiers, Sable would occasionally hire superhuman freelance operatives to serve on the Pack such as Paladin, Prowler, Rocket Racer, and Sandman. Alternatively, Sable has twice formed elite versions of the Wild Pack, composed of superhuman agents — first with the Outlaws, and later, the Intruders. Sable has also been known to parcel smaller-scale contracts to reduced versions of the Wild Pack such as the Delta Team.

Once, Silver Sable steps down from leadership of the Wild Pack. This was during a period of soul-searching after Silver Sable is believed to be pregnant, although this is actually due to a computer error. During this time, the Wild Pack is led by Sable's father who had not died, but was rescued from his captors by Sable and the Wild Pack. As Sable monitors the team's progress however, she feels compelled to step in and take an active hand in leadership once more, stating that the team is like a family to her and is where she belongs.

More recently, the Wild Pack has become more and more unstable. The elite agents who have worked with Silver Sable for a long time have gone their separate ways. Sable is left to lead a team that is becoming increasingly lazy and incompetent. After four unsuccessful missions and the betrayal of several agents, Silver Sable decides that the group has become too broken and fractured to maintain. Bringing her agents together one last time, Silver Sable informs them that she is going into retirement and that the Pack themselves will be dissolved.

The Outlaws
Sable and the Wild Pack cross paths with many heroes over the years, such as Hawkeye, Le Peregine and Spider-Man. After a number of encounters with superhuman agents, vigilantes and enemies, Sable begins to use them in future assignments.  Later, Sable decides to create an elite version of the Wild Pack, the Outlaws. The Outlaws feature Sable associates Prowler, Puma, Rocket Racer, Sandman and Will o' the Wisp. They encounter Excalibur in the course of their adventures but are soon disbanded in favor of the traditional Wild Pack.

The Intruders
Silver Sable continues to lead her Wild Pack in mercenary endeavors. She also hires the hero Battlestar to serve on the team. When the team begins attracting superhuman associates such as the Fin and Man-Eater, Sable forms another elite offshoot of the Wild Pack called the Intruders. Sandman leads the Intruders, which includes Fin, Lightbright, Man-Eater and Paladin. They often engage in assignments independently of the Wild Pack. Although the team never officially disbands, the Intruders are presumably dissolved by Silver Sable several months later.

Return of the Wild Pack
Silver Sable later resurfaced following her apparent death and has reformed the Wild Pack to help her against Countess Katrina Karkov who has allied with Norman Osborn and his Goblin Army. This team consists of Foxtrot, Juliet, Romeo, Tango, and X-Ray.

Known members
 Silver Sable (Ernst Sablinova) - Along with his twin brother Fritz, Silver Sable is one of the co-founders and leaders of the original Wild Pack. He also served on the 1959 Avengers team.
 Silver Sable (Silver Sablinova) - Silver Sable is the leader of Wild Pack and the daughter of the original Silver Sable.
 Fritz Sablinova - Along with his twin brother Ernst, Sablinova is one of the co-founders and leaders of the original Wild Pack. He is shot and killed by the Foreigner.
 Foxtrot - 
 Juliet - 
 Romeo - 
 Tango - 
 X-Ray -

Wild Pack's A-Team
 Larry Arnold - Arnold is a longtime friend of Raul Quentino. When Quentino is injured and loses the ability to walk, he asks that Arnold take his place on the team.
 Battlestar (Lemar Hoskins) - Battlestar has superhuman strength, speed, agility, durability and reflexes. He is a member of A.R.M.O.R.
 Amy Chen (Amelia Chen) - Chen is a highly skilled assassin.
 Crippler (Carl Striklan) - Crippler is a mercenary and former HYDRA member.
 Doug Powell - Powell is a mercenary who tries out for the team in the first issue of Silver Sable & the Wild Pack.
 Raul Quentino - Quentino is a former gang member with electronic skills and abilities. He has built and repaired all of the equipment used by the Wild Pack on their missions. Raul ends up injured enough to be paraplegic in one of the missions.
 Sandman (Flint Marko) - Sandman has the ability to convert his body into sand and shapeshift.

Wild Pack's Administration and Support
 Lorna Kleinfeldt - Kleinfeldt is the manager of Wild Pack.
 Mortimer - Uncle Morty is the uncle of Silver Sable. He acts as her assistant.
 Samantha Powell - Powell works for the public relations department of Silver Sable International, the corporation that runs Wild Pack.
 Silver Wolf (Andreas Vadas) - Silver Wolf is Silver Sable's right-hand man at Silver Sable International. He betrays the team to a terrorist organization.

The Outlaws
 Prowler (Hobie Brown) - The Prowler wears a cape that allows flight and gadgets on his wrists and ankles that produce various projectile weapons.
 Puma (Thomas Fireheart) - Puma has the ability to transform into a werecat. He is the CEO of Fireheart Enterprises.
 Rocket Racer (Robert Farrell) - Rocket Racer uses a jet-powered skateboard and wears gloves that can shoot missiles. He is working for Briggs Chemical LLC.
 Sandman
 Will o' the Wisp (Jackson Arvad) - Will o' the Wisp has the ability to control the density of his body.

Intruders
 Fin - Fin has superhuman strength. He is a member of the Garrison, Vermont's Initiative team.
 Lightbright (Obax Majid) - Lightbright can project heat and light from her body.
 Man-Eater (Malcolm Gregory Murphy) - Man-Eater is a human and a tiger merged into one body. He is a member of the Garrison, Vermont's Initiative team.
 Paladin - Paladin has superhuman strength, speed, agility, durability and reflexes.
 Sandman

Freelance
 Cat (Shen Kuei) - Cat is an expert in martial arts.
 Deathlok (Michael Collins) - Deathlok is a cyborg that has superhuman strength, speed, agility, durability, reflexes, sight and hearing.
 Hawkeye (Clinton Francis Barton) - Hawkeye is a master archer and marksman. He is member of the Avengers, on the staff at the Avengers Academy and a member of S.H.I.E.L.D.'s Secret Avengers.
 Madcap - Madcap has the ability to control people's minds, making them crazy for several minutes. He also has a healing factor. When he is hired by Sable, he is disguising himself as Nomad. He is a member of the Masters of Evil.
 Le Peregrine (Alain Racine) - Le Peregrine is an expert in savate (French kickboxing) and wears a flight-suit.
 Paladin
 Prowler
 Rocket Racer
 Sandman
 Spider-Man (Peter Benjamin Parker) - Spider-Man has superhuman strength, speed, agility, durability, and reflexes. He also possesses the ability to stick to surfaces and has a spider-sense, alerting him to danger. He is member of the Avengers.

Other versions
There is an Ultimate Marvel version of the Wild Pack that is led by Silver Sable to take down Spider-Man and later Venom. Known members of the Wild Pack are Chen, Powell, and Quentino.

In other media

Television
 The Wild Pack appears in the 1990s Spider-Man animated series five-part episode "Six Forgotten Warriors". Led by Silver Sable, they are hired by Rheinholt Kragor to gather information about a Doomsday device, capture two scientists to operate it, and keep it from falling into the Kingpin's hands. Sable later kidnaps Spider-Man, Kingpin, and the Insidious Six for Rheinholt, but the Wild Pack eventually betray Rheinholt and join forces with Spider-Man, Captain America, and the Insidious Six to fight the Red Skull, Rheinholt after he becomes Electro, and the Chameleon.
 The Wild Pack appears in the 2010s Spider-Man animated series. This incarnation of the group consists of Silver Sable, Paladin, Puma, and Battlestar. In the episode "Take Two", they are hired by an anonymous client to steal the Neuro Cortex from Horizon High. Paladin pretends to rob Oscorp in order to fight Spider-Man so Silver Sable can learn his moves. During the heist, the Wild Pack fights Spider-Man, who manages to defeat them with assistance from Doctor Octopus. The Wild Pack are subsequently arrested. In "Between an Ock and a Hard Place", it is revealed that the Wild Pack were hired by Doctor Octopus.

Video games
 The Wild Pack appear in the Ultimate Spider-Man video game. Led by Silver Sable, they are hired by Bolivar Trask to capture Eddie Brock Jr. so that he can recreate the Venom suit. The Wild Pack soldiers serve as enemies in the game until the end of the story when their contract with Trask expires.
 The Wild Pack appear in Spider-Man: Shattered Dimensions. In the final Amazing segment, Silver Sable leads them in a hunt for the Juggernaut to collect a bounty on his head. Spider-Man encounters them at a construction site while searching for a Tablet of Order and Chaos fragment, and the Wild Pack soldiers attack him to claim a bounty on his head as well. The Wild Pack soldiers serve as enemies throughout the level until they abandon the hunt after an under-construction Oscorp building collapses on top of Spider-Man and the Juggernaut. During the end credits, the Wild Pack capture the Juggernaut after his defeat at Spider-Man's hands.

References

External links
 Wild Pack at Marvel.com
 Wild Pack at Marvel Wiki
 Wild Pack at Comic Vine

Marvel Comics superhero teams
Fictional organizations
Fictional mercenaries in comics
Spider-Man characters
Fictional Eastern European people